Australian Commendations are awards of recognition which all Department of Defence personnel are eligible; including both Defence Members and the Australian Public Service (APS). The Scheme provides a means to formally recognise outstanding/exceptional achievement, or specific acts of bravery for which awards from within the Australian Honours System are not an appropriate medium of recognition. The circumstances attracting the award of a commendation may relate to an isolated instance or to a series of instances over a period of time.

National Commendations
 Commendation for Gallantry
 Commendation for Brave Conduct
 Commendation for Distinguished Service

Australian Defence Force Commendations
 Secretary/Chief of Defence Force Joint Commendation
 Secretary of Defence Commendation
 Chief of Defence Force Commendation
 Defence Support Services Commendation (Gold, Silver & Bronze)
 Australian Defence Force Commendation (Gold, Silver & Bronze)
 Navy Commendation (Gold, Silver & Bronze)
 Army Commendation (Gold, Silver & Bronze)
 Air Force Commendation (Gold, Silver & Bronze)

Australian Defence Force Cadets Commendations
 Director General Australian Navy Cadets Commendation
 National Commander Australian Navy Cadets Commendation (Gold, Silver & Bronze)
 Commander - Australian Army Cadets Commendation (Gold)
 Deputy Commander - Australian Army Cadets Commendation (Silver)
 Regional Commander - Australian Army Cadets Commendation (Bronze)
 Director General Cadets - Air Force Commendation (Bronze)
 Commander - Australian Air Force Cadets Commendation (Silver)

Description 
Commendations come in three grades (Gold, Silver & Bronze) of which Gold is the highest and Bronze is the lowest.

See also

 Australian Honours System
 Australian Honours Order of Precedence

References 
 AAFC Commendations
 AAC Commendations 
 Defence Commendation Scheme

Military awards and decorations of Australia